The  (High-decker/High-grade/High-level Super Express) was an electric multiple unit (EMU) train type operated by the Odakyu Electric Railway on Romancecar services in the Tokyo area of Japan between 1987 and 2012.

Formation
Each trainset consisted of 11 cars, 9 of which were powered.

Operations
The 10000 series HiSE operated mainly between Shinjuku Station in Tokyo and Hakone-Yumoto Station (about 88 km).

Resale
Sets number 2 and 3 were donated to the Nagano Electric Railway in 2005. They were converted to 4-car 1000 series sets at Nippon Sharyo manufacturing factory in Toyokawa, Aichi Prefecture.

Withdrawal and preservation
The two remaining 10000 series HiSE sets were withdrawn by Odakyu on 16 March 2012. One car is preserved at the Romancecar Museum.

Interior

References

 "Daiya Jōhō" Magazine, May 2007 issue

External links

 Odakyu Romancecar Lineup 
 Odakyu "last running" site 

Electric multiple units of Japan
10000 series HiSE
Train-related introductions in 1987
Articulated passenger trains
1500 V DC multiple units of Japan